JDS Kitakami (DE-213) is the third ship of  of Japan Maritime Self-Defense Force.

Development and design 
This class was the first JMSDF surface combatant adopted shelter-deck design. Propulsion systems varied in each vessels because the JMSDF tried to find the best way in the propulsion systems of future DEs.

Main air-search radar was a OPS-2, Japanese variant of the American AN/SPS-12.

Construction and career
Kitakami was laid down on 7 July 1962 at IHI Corporation, Tokyo and launched on 21 June 1963.

On 31 January 1990, the 32nd Escort Corps was abolished, the type was changed to a special service ship, and the ship registration number was changed to ASU-7016. Transferred to the Ominato District Force as a ship under direct control. The long torpedo launcher has been removed due to the conversion work to the special service ship.

She was stricken on 16 November 1993.

References

1963 ships
Ships built by IHI Corporation
Isuzu-class destroyer escorts